Matw or MATW may refer to:

Mad at the World, or MATW, a Christian rock band from Southern California
Madman Across the Water, an album by Elton John
MATW (charity), Muslims Around the World charity founded by Ali Banat
Me Against the World, an album by Tupac Shakur